World Statesman is an album by trumpeter Dizzy Gillespie, recorded in 1956 and released on the Norgran label. The album was reissued as part of the 2CD compilation Birks Works: The Verve Big Band Sessions.

Reception
The AllMusic review states: "This set introduced the new Dizzy Gillespie big band which was making headlines for the acclaim it received (and for the excitement it caused) during its State Department-sponsored world tours... this brilliant (and historic) orchestra really shows a great deal of spirit, power and creativity."

Track listing
All compositions by Dizzy Gillespie except as indicated

Side One:
 "Dizzy's Business" (Ernie Wilkins) - 3:37    
 "Jessica's Day" (Quincy Jones) - 4:50   
 "Tour de Force" - 5:04  
 "I Can't Get Started" (Vernon Duke, Ira Gershwin) - 2:55
 "Doodlin'" (Horace Silver) - 3:56
Side Two:  
 "A Night in Tunisia" -  5:34
 "Stella by Starlight" (Ned Washington, Victor Young) - 4:07
 "The Champ" - 4:42
 "My Reverie" (Larry Clinton, Claude Debussy) - 2:52
 "Dizzy's Blues" (A. K. Salim) - 2:32

Personnel
Dizzy Gillespie - trumpet, vocals
Joe Gordon, Quincy Jones, Ermit V. Perry, Carl Warwick - trumpet
Rod Levitt, Melba Liston, Frank Rehak - trombone
Jimmy Powell, Phil Woods - alto saxophone
Billy Mitchell, Ernie Wilkins - tenor saxophone
Marty Flax - baritone saxophone
Walter Davis Jr. - piano
Nelson Boyd - bass
Charlie Persip - drums

References 

Dizzy Gillespie albums
1956 albums
Norgran Records albums
Albums produced by Norman Granz